Banca Generali S.p.A. is an Italian bank focused on private banking and wealth management for high-net-worth individuals. The bank is a component of FTSE MIB index, representing the blue-chip of Borsa Italiana. The majority of its shares are owned by the Italian Insurance Group, Assicurazioni Generali. 

In April 2018, Banca Generali won Global Brands Awards organized by Global Brands Magazine. It has also been awarded the "Best Private Bank in Italy Award" from the FT's Group magazines for the years 2012, 2015, 2017, 2018 and 2019.

In September 2018, Banca Generali inaugurated new operating offices in Citylife.

References

External links
 

Banks of Italy
Companies based in Milan
Companies based in Trieste
Generali Group